This is a list of parishes for the Canadian province of Prince Edward Island.

Prince County
North Parish
Egmont Parish
Halifax Parish
Richmond Parish
St. David's Parish

Queens County
Grenville Parish
Hillsboro Parish
Charlotte Parish
Bedford Parish
St. John's Parish

Kings County
St. Patrick's Parish
East Parish
St. George's Parish
St. Andrew's Parish

 
Parishes